Alessandro Frara (born 7 November 1982) is a former Italian footballer who played as a midfielder.

Career
Frara started his career at hometown club Juventus. With the Italian giant, he played at youth side until June 2002. In June 2002, he was loaned to Bologna and made his Serie A debut on 14 September 2002, against A.S. Roma.

In January 2008 he was signed by Rimini. But he suffered from leg injuries and had an operation in May. He played his first game for Rimini in 2008–09 season.

He scored his first Serie A goal with Frosinone on 1 November 2015 in a 4–1 loss to Fiorentina.

References

External links
 Profile at La Gazzetta dello Sport 2007-08 
 Profile at La Gazzetta dello Sport 2008-09 
aic.football.it

FIGC National Team Archive 

1982 births
Living people
Italian footballers
Italy youth international footballers
Juventus F.C. players
Bologna F.C. 1909 players
Ternana Calcio players
Spezia Calcio players
Rimini F.C. 1912 players
S.S.D. Varese Calcio players
Frosinone Calcio players
Serie A players
Serie B players
Association football midfielders
Footballers from Turin